Knäppupp (Swedish: "unbutton") was the collective name of a popular revue series produced by Swedish musician and entertainer Povel Ramel. It was associated with Knäppupp AB, the production company that was set up specifically for the purpose of managing and financing the theatrical performances. The company was active from 1952 to 1968. Ramel was the driving force behind the revues and wrote and performed most of the material himself. Among the more prolific co-actors were Martin Ljung and Brita Borg.

Productions

Films 

Theatre in Sweden